A narrative ballet or story ballet is a form of ballet that has a plot and characters. It is typically a production with full sets and costumes. It was an invention of the eighteenth century.

Most romantic and classical ballets of the 19th century were narrative ballets.  Among the most well known are Swan Lake, The Sleeping Beauty, and Cinderella. For these and other classic narrative ballets it is common for ballet directors to create their own choreography, while maintaining the plot and music used by the original 19th-century choreographer. Kenneth MacMillan and Frederick Ashton were neoclassical ballet choreographers that created original narrative ballets in the 20th century.

Narrative ballets are essential to a ballet company's repertoire, because they tend to generate the highest sales and bring families with children to see the ballet.  Many newer narrative ballets are adapted from familiar stories or literature because they are recognizable to audiences.

Notable narrative ballets
 Swan Lake
 Giselle
 The Nutcracker
 Romeo and Juliet
 L'histoire de Manon

See also
 Ballet d'action
 Comic ballet
 List of ballets by title
 List of historical ballet characters

References

Sources

Ballet terminology